12 Rounds 2: Reloaded (also known as 12 Rounds 2 and 12 Rounds: Reloaded) is a 2013 American action film directed by Roel Reiné. The film stars Randy Orton, Tom Stevens, Brian Markinson and Cindy Busby. It is a sequel to 2009's 12 Rounds starring John Cena. Unlike the original which saw a theatrical release, the film was released on direct-to-DVD and Blu-ray in the United States on June 4, 2013.

Plot 

Paramedic Nick Malloy and his wife Sarah are going home after a movie, when a horrible car accident takes place. Nick attempts to aid and rescue the victims: a young boy and a married couple, but despite Nick's efforts, the woman dies; this completely shatters Nick as it never happened before in his entire career.

One year later, Nick and his fellow paramedic Jay Thompson are going to work when they get an anonymous call from an abandoned building site where they find a dying citizen. They attempt to aid him, only to find the number 1 stitched on his stomach alongside a bomb, but before they can do something about it, Nick receives a phone call. The caller asks Nick to step outside the ambulance after answering it. Nick now finds himself playing a game called 12 Rounds by Patrick Heller, moonlighting as a mastermind and using Sarah as a pawn. The caller tells Nick that he is watching him through security cameras and gives Nick a hint about his ambulance exploding. Immediately the ambulance explodes, killing the citizen instantly and setting Jay on fire, although Nick manages to save him.

For Round 2, Nick receives a text message which leads him to a parking lot where a car waits for him. For Round 3, Nick must find a clue to his next destination in the car. Nick finds a matchbox with Palace Hotel written on it. Driving frantically to the hotel, Nick takes an alternative route. An enraged Heller threatens to detonate the bomb under the car but Nick manages to reach the Hotel with two seconds to spare.

As the game unfolds, Detectives McKenzie and Sykes are investigating the ambulance explosion, and while Sykes immediately blames Nick for everything, McKenzie has her doubts.

Round 4 begins in the Palace Hotel as Nick talks with the hotel manager, who is wearing a white top with a cue ball on the front with the number "4" on it and a key that dangles around his neck. Realizing this the 4th round, Nick attacks the manager to steal the key. Heller tells Nick he must find a room that will give him all the answers. Nick finds out it's room 44, and inside the room, a young boy, Tommy Weaver, is having fun with a prostitute named Amber.

Round 5 begins when he enters the room. Nick ransacks the room and gets in a fight with Tommy and the prostitute. Before the phone rings in the room which is Heller. He orders Nick to bring "it with you" and get into a car parked next to Tommy's. Nick notices a tattoo on Tommy, the same as the calling card of the mastermind. However, as Nick takes Tommy out of the room, he gets into a fight with the security guard but manages to escape. Nick puts Tommy in the car next to his and finds a black glove with some coordinates leading to the Intersection of Grant and Sherwood Street.

During the trip, Nick learns that Tommy has a parole anklet by following his DUI arrest, and Heller blocks the signal to the anklet so that Nick can stay focused on his timed mission. During the trip they stop halfway because both Nick and Tommy can hear a cell phone in the vehicle's trunk. They open the trunk to find Tommy's lawyer, Roberta Shaw, dead. For Round 6, they arrive at Grant and Sherwood intersection and find a telephone booth. Heller tells them a series of events led them there. Tommy finds out this is the street where he had an accident a year ago, that followed his DUI arrest. McKenzie and Sykes arrive at the hotel and talk with the security guard and the manager to find out about what Nick did earlier in the night and begin to suspect it is all linked to the governor's disappearance.

Meanwhile, Nick begins to put all the pieces of the puzzle together, and finds out he was at the right place at the right time a year ago. At the accident at the start of the film, Tommy was the young boy and the woman who died was Patrick's wife. Immediately after, Tommy tries to escape and as Nick chases him, Heller reactivates Tommy's anklet signal. Along the way, Tommy finds 2 police officers and tries to turn himself into them, telling them that Nick is chasing him for no apparent reason. But Nick catches up to him, engages and defeats the officers and steals their police car. Chased down by police and the detectives, they take an alternative route until they meet a dead end. Nick escapes by driving up into a public parking garage building. When they reach the top they are found and cornered by Detective McKenzie, to whom they reveal Heller's game.

McKenzie tells them the governor has disappeared and Tommy reveals he is his father. Heller calls Nick and tells him to put Tommy on the phone. Heller tells Tommy the location for Round 7. McKenzie tells them to keep playing his game to discover his true intentions.

For Round 7 they must reach an abandoned sugar factory which is how Tommy's father got into the government. Tommy finds his father buried in raw sugar. Nick drives a tractor to stop the overflowing of the sugar. Meanwhile, the detectives track down a signal to an abandoned building and find an armed man behind metal doors. Sykes shoots the man and they discover is a judge.

For Round 8, Nick and Tommy must save the governor and when they do, Heller appears with Sarah, shoots Tommy's father and tells Nick that the detectives already took care of Round 9 for him. Back in the abandoned building a livestream of Heller begins in the computer and he reveals that Sykes was the first officer to arrive at the scene of the car accident and while the governor paid the lawyer and judge to reduce Tommy's sentence to one year probation, Sykes destroyed the evidence and got promoted to detective in the process. As Sykes apologizes to McKenzie a countdown appears in the computer and while McKenzie and the other officer says leave the room, Sykes stays and gets obliterated by the explosion. McKenzie then rushes out to find Nick. Round 10 begins when Tommy, still broken after his father's death, follows Heller's instructions and with a tazer incapacitates Nick temporarily.

Round 11 begins in front of a club called "Karma". It turns out the citizen who died in the ambulance worked there. Heller gives 2 vodka bottles to Tommy and one is poisoned. Tommy needs to drink one and when he does, he presumes he will die, but when he doesn't, starts laughing hysterically but Heller pours the contents of the other bottle over Tommy, shoots it and leaves Tommy to die.

For the Final Round, Heller has Nick and Sarah tied up in the back of his SUV and calls 911 to tell emergency services that there will be a horrible accident at Grant and Sherwood Intersection as Heller initiates a countdown in the SUV. Nick asks him what he would've done to save his wife's life to which Heller replies "Anything". Nick immediately breaks free and fights Heller, takes his gun and shoots the back of the SUV so he and Sarah can roll out of the vehicle. Heller breaks down, remembering the night's events and his wife, before shouting 'Diana' as the SUV exploded, killing him instantly.

Emergency services arrive and aid both Nick and Sarah as Detective McKenzie arrives and thanks Nick for his help during the night by saying, 'It's Over' and walking away from the ambulance.

Cast 
 Randy Orton as Nick Malloy
 Tom Stevens as Tommy Weaver
 Brian Markinson as Patrick Heller
 Venus Terzo as Detective McKenzie
 Cindy Busby as Sarah Malloy
 Sean Rogerson as Detective Sykes
 Colin Lawrence as Jay Thompson
 Chelsey Reist as Amber
 Sebastian Spence as Governor Devlin Weaver
 Janene Carleton as Diana Heller
 Rachel Hayward as Roberta Shaw

Production 
Former WWE wrestler CM Punk said that he was initially chosen to star in the film, but was pulled from the project due to Punk's obligations for the WWE European tour taking place during filming in addition to being their WWE Champion at the time. John Cena was also considered to reprise his role from the first, and Chris Jericho was also considered.

Release 
The DVD and Blu-ray were released in Region 1 in the United States on June 4, 2013, and Region 2 in the United Kingdom on 24 June. It was distributed by 20th Century Fox Home Entertainment. It made $919,421 worth of DVD units and $584,831 in Blu-ray units since June.

Reception 
Tyler Foster of DVD Talk rated it 1.5/5 stars and wrote: "Even the world's most committed Randy Orton fan won't get anything out of 12 Rounds 2, a dull rehash of a million other, better action movies that saddles Orton with an uninteresting character". David Johnson of DVD Verdict compared it negatively to the first film and wrote: "With 12 Rounds 2 and its dearth of compelling derring-do, we're left with Randy Orton grunting and running an obstacle course. No thanks".

Sequel
A third film in the franchise called 12 Rounds 3: Lockdown was released in September 2015, starring Dean Ambrose.

References

External links 
 
 
 

2013 films
2013 direct-to-video films
2013 action films
American action films
2010s English-language films
Direct-to-video action films
Direct-to-video sequel films
Films directed by Roel Reiné
Films set in British Columbia
Films shot in Vancouver
WWE Studios films
12 Rounds films
2010s American films